Kesi K. Afalava (born September 26, 1961) was a Canadian football defensive lineman who played for the Winnipeg Blue Bombers and the BC Lions of the Canadian Football League. During the 1984 season, Afalava played in two games for the Blue Bombers and one game for the Lions.

References 

1961 births
Living people
Canadian football defensive linemen
American football defensive linemen
Hawaii Rainbow Warriors football players
Winnipeg Blue Bombers players
BC Lions players